Orlando Lübbert (born 1 December 1945) is a Chilean screenwriter and film director. He is best known for his film A Cab for Three.

Filmography
 Der Übergang (1978)
  (1987)
 Taxi para tres (2001)
 Cirqo (2013)

References

External links
 

1945 births
Living people
People from Santiago
Chilean film directors
Chilean screenwriters
Male screenwriters